Darren Roberts is the name of:
Darren Roberts (footballer) (born 1969), English footballer
Darren Roberts (EastEnders), a fictional character in the BBC soap opera